The following are the national records in athletics in Hungary maintained by Hungary's national athletics federation: Magyar Atlétikai Szövetség (MASZ).

Outdoor

Key to tables:

+ = en route to a longer distance

h = hand timing

X = unratified due to no doping control

Men

Women

Indoor

Men

Women

Notes

References

General 
Hungarian records - Men Outdoor 5 October 2019 updated
Hungarian records - Women Outdoor 21 August 2022 updated
Hungarian records - Men Indoor 30 January 2021 updated
Hungarian records - Women Indoor 3 March 2019 updated

Specific

External links
MASZ web site

Hungary
Records
Athletics
Athletics